Stan Hochman (October 15, 1928April 9, 2015), was a sportswriter who covered the Philadelphia Phillies for the Philadelphia Daily News. He was a voting member of the Baseball Writers' Association of America (BBWAA), whose main task is to vote on candidates for induction into the National Baseball Hall of Fame. Other newspapers Hochman worked for include the Brownsville Herald, Corpus Christi Caller-Times, Waco News-Tribune, and San Bernardino Sun.

Hochman was born on October 15, 1928, in Brooklyn, New York. He attended New York University, where he earned his bachelor's degree, in 1948, and his master's degree, in 1949. Hochman's career at the Daily News began on June 9, 1959, and he spent 55 years covering not just the Phillies, but everything sports, in what was to be his adopted hometown — and the town loved him back for it. He is a member of the Philadelphia Sports Hall of Fame. Hochman died on April 9, 2015, in Bryn Mawr, Pennsylvania and is interred at Har Nebo Cemetery in Philadelphia, Pennsylvania.

References

External links
Stan Hochman at Broadcast Pioneers of Philadelphia Hall of Fame
Stan Hochman at Philadelphia Sports Hall of Fame

1928 births
2015 deaths
People from Brooklyn
People from Bryn Mawr, Pennsylvania
New York University alumni
20th-century American writers
American sportswriters
Baseball writers
Burials in Pennsylvania